Samuel Harding Duvall (March 11, 1836 in Liberty, Indiana – September 26, 1908 in Liberty, Indiana) was an American archer who competed in the 1904 Summer Olympics.

Duvall won the silver medal in the team competition. In the Double American round he finished fourteenth.

References

External links

1836 births
1908 deaths
American male archers
Archers at the 1904 Summer Olympics
Olympic silver medalists for the United States in archery
Medalists at the 1904 Summer Olympics
19th-century American people
20th-century American people
People from Liberty, Indiana
Sportspeople from Indiana